GIDA may refer to:

 Goshree Islands Development Authority
 Alexandreia